Talassia dagueneti is a species of very small sea snail, a marine gastropod mollusk in the family Vanikoridae.

Description
The length of the shell attains 2 mm.

Distribution
This marine species was found in the fosse du Cap Breton, Bay of Biscay.

References

 Nordsieck, F. (1974). Molluschi dei fondali della platea continentale fra la Corsica e la Sardegna. La Conchiglia. 61: 11-14.
 Warén A. & Bouchet P. (1988) A new species of Vanikoridae from the western Mediterranean, with remarks on the Northeast Atlantic species of the family. Bollettino Malacologico 24(5-8): 73-100.
 Sysoev A.V. (2014). Deep-sea fauna of European seas: An annotated species check-list of benthic invertebrates living deeper than 2000 m in the seas bordering Europe. Gastropoda. Invertebrate Zoology. Vol.11. No.1: 134–155

External links
 Folin L. de & Périer L. (1867-1887). Les fonds de la mer. Paris: Savy. 4 volumes. Dates after Rehder (1946), Proceedings of the Malacological Society of London, 27: 74-75. Vol. 1: 1-48 (1867), 49-112 (1868), 113-176 (1869), 177-256 (1870), 257-272 (1872), pls 1-32; Vol. 2: 1-64 (1872), 65-112 (1873), 113-124 (1874), 125-160 (1875), 161-208 (1873), 209-304 (1874), 305-360 (1875), 361-365 (1876), pls 1-11; Vol. 3: 1-96 (1876), 97-208 (1877), 209-304 (1879), 305-337 (1880), pls 1-9; Vol. 4: 1-32 (1881), 33-148 (1881-1884), 149-192 (1884-1887), 192-240 (1887), pls 1-15
  Gofas, S.; Le Renard, J.; Bouchet, P. (2001). Mollusca. in: Costello, M.J. et al. (eds), European Register of Marine Species: a check-list of the marine species in Europe and a bibliography of guides to their identification. Patrimoines Naturels. 50: 180-213
 Hoffman, L.; Freiwald, A. (2022). A review of Atlantic deep-water species in the genus Talassia (Caenogastropoda, Vanikoridae). European Journal of Taxonomy. 819

Vanikoridae
Gastropods described in 1873